Segonzano (Segonzàn in local dialect) is a comune (municipality) in Trentino in the northern Italian region Trentino-Alto Adige/Südtirol, located about  northeast of Trento.

Main sights
Castle, only partially preserved. It was damaged during a local battle between French and Austrian troops in 1796.
Sanctuary of Madonna dell'Aiuto
The "Piramidi di Terra", natural pyramids created by erosion.

References

Cities and towns in Trentino-Alto Adige/Südtirol